Dorrian's Red Hand, also known simply as Dorrian's, is a famed Irish-American bar located at 1616 Second Avenue at East 84th Street, on the Upper East Side of Manhattan, New York City, New York.

Started by Irish immigrant James "Red Dog" Dorrian in 1960 and operated by his son Jack, the popular hangout became a social pillar for preppy Upper East Side teenagers, college students, and young urban professionals. It is known for its "old time" atmosphere and the chummy and clubby demeanor of its patrons.
Today, the bar is still family-owned and managed by Jack Dorrian's son, Jimmy. Dorrian's has expanded to a second location in Jersey City, New Jersey. Dorrian's Red Hand is a common hang out for the players of the New York Yankees.

In popular culture 
Dorrian's has served as a filming location for U.S. Marshals, The Deli, and episodes of Gossip Girl, Gallery Girls, and "Fleishman Is In Trouble".

See also
 List of Irish themed restaurants

References

External links 
 

Irish-American culture in New York City
Irish restaurants in the United States
Restaurants in Manhattan
Drinking establishments in Manhattan
Restaurants established in 1960
Restaurants in New Jersey
Upper East Side
Second Avenue (Manhattan)
1960 establishments in New York City